Krasnaya Gorka is a rural locality (a village) in Golovinskoye Rural Settlement, Sudogodsky District, Vladimir Oblast, Russia. The population was 20 as of 2010. There are 5 streets.

Geography 
Krasnaya Gorka is located on the Soyma River, 12 km northwest of Sudogda (the district's administrative centre) by road. Soyma is the nearest rural locality.

References 

Rural localities in Sudogodsky District